Labu may refer to:
 Labu Rahman, a Bangladeshi musician, and member of band Feedback
 Mukim Labu, Brunei
 Labu, Negeri Sembilan, Malaysia
 Labu Komuter station, a railway station
 Labu language
 Libu, an ancient Libyan tribe